Fay is a unisex given name, and may refer to:

 E. Fay Jones (1921–2004), American architect
 Fay Babcock (1895–1970), American film set director
 Fay Bainter (1893–1968), American actress
 Fay Baker (1917–1987), American actress
 Fay B. Begor (1916–1943), American physician
 Fay Bellamy Powell (1938–2013), American civil rights activist
 Fay G. Child (1908-1965), American politician and newspaper editor
 Fay Chung (born 1941), Zimbabwean educator
 Fay Compton (1894–1978), English actress
 Fay Coyle (1933–2007), Northern Irish footballer
 Fay Cravens (1872-1955), American politician and newspaper editor
 Fay Crocker (1914–1983), Uruguayan golfer
 Fay Davis (1873–1945), American actress
 Fay Devlin (21st century), Irish footballer
 Fay Dowker (21st century), British theoretical physicist
 Fay Gale (1932–2008), Australian cultural geographer
 Fay Gillis Wells (1908–2002), American aviator
 Fay Godwin (1931–2005), British photographer
 Fay Holden (1893–1973), American actress
 Fay Holderness (1881–1963), American actor
 Fay Jones (born 1985), British politician
 Fay Kanin (1917–2013), American screenwriter
 Fay Kelton (21st century), Australian actress
 Fay King (American football) (1922–1983), American football player
 Fay King (1889–1???), American cartoonist
 Fay Kleinman (1912–2012), American painter
 Fay Lanphier (1905–1959), American model
 Fay Lemport (20th century), American actress
 Fay Masterson (born 1974), English actress
 Fay McAlpine (born 1960), New Zealand designer, typographer and academic at Massey University
 Fay McKay (1930–2008), American entertainer
 Fay McKenzie (born 1918), American actor
 Fay Moulton (1876–1945), American sprinter
 Fay Na (19th century), King of Champasak
Fay Peck (1931–2016) was an American Expressionist artist.
 Fay Presto (born 1948), British magician
 Fay Ripley (born 1966), English actress
 Fay Rusling (21st century), British comedy writer
 Fay Spain (1932–1983), American actress
 Fay Taylour (1904–1983), Irish motorcycle racer
 Fay Templeton (1865–1939), American actress
 Fay Thomas (1903–1990), American baseball player
 Fay Tincher (1884–1983), American actress
 Fay Vincent (born 1938), American film studio executive
 Fay Webb-Gardner (1885–1969), American political hostess
 Fay Weldon (1931–2023), English author
 Fay Wray (1907–2004), American actress
 Fay Zwicky (born 1933), Australian poet
 Hesba Fay Brinsmead (1922–2003), Australian author
 Melissa Fay Greene (born 1952), American journalist
 Mildred Fay Jefferson (1927–2010), American physician

Fictional characters
Fay Marvin, a character in the 1991 American comedy movie What About Bob?

See also
 Faye (given name)
 Fay-Ann
 Fay-Cooper

English-language unisex given names
Feminine given names
Given names
Masculine given names